Boris Katchouk (born June 18, 1998) is a Canadian-Russian professional ice hockey winger for the Chicago Blackhawks of the National Hockey League (NHL). Katchouk was drafted in the 2016 NHL Entry Draft in the second round (44th) by the Tampa Bay Lightning.

Early life
Katchouk was born on June 18, 1998, in Vancouver, British Columbia, Canada to Russian parents, Yelena Tumanova and Viktor Katchouk, and grew up alongside his two older brothers, Alex and Yuri. His mother Yelena represented the Soviet Union in speed skating at the 1988 Winter Olympics. His family moved from Russia to Canada for work in 1992 and moved from Montreal to Vancouver before settling down in Waterloo, Ontario. He holds Canadian and Russian dual citizenship.

Growing up, Katchouk was a dual athlete as he played both ice hockey and box lacrosse.

Playing career
Katchouk began his ice hockey career with the Waterloo Wolves Minor Midget team in the Alliance Hockey League. During the 2013–14 season, he recorded 25 goals and 33 assists for 58 points through 29 games while also guiding the team to an AHMMPL Championship. Following this, he joined the Northern Ontario Junior Hockey League's Soo Thunderbirds and led them to the James Aspin Trophy, Copeland Cup McNamara Trophy, and Dudley Hewitt Cup. During the Dudley Hewitt Cup tournament, Katchouk led all Thunderbird players in scoring with six points. During this time, he also attended Resurrection Catholic Secondary School before being drafted by the Sault Ste. Marie Greyhounds in the Ontario Hockey League (OHL). He played 12 games with the Greyhounds as a 16-year-old during the 2014–15 OHL season but fully began his career the following year.

Major junior
Upon joining the Greyhounds for the 2015–16 season, Katchouk recorded 24 goals and 27 assists for 51 points in 63 games. During his rookie season, Katchouk was automatically suspended for two games as a result of a fight with Niki Petti. He concluded the season by being selected for the OHL's All-Rookie Team and being named the Greyhounds' Rookie of the Year. Katchouk also earned a 25th final ranking amongst North American skaters by the NHL Central Scouting Bureau prior to the 2016 NHL Entry Draft. He was eventually drafted in the second round, 44th overall, by the Tampa Bay Lightning and participated in their training camp.

Katchouk returned to the Greyhounds for his sophomore season, where he recorded 35 goals and 64 points in 66 games. As the team qualified for the 2017 OHL playoffs, he led all Greyhound skaters in both goals and points through 11 games. The following year, Katchouk again helped the Greyhounds qualify for the OHL playoffs. During their series against the Owen Sound Attack, Katchouk scored a hat trick to help lift the Greyhounds to a Game 7 win and qualify for the OHL’s Western Conference final.

Professional
Following his major junior career, Katchouk was assigned to the Lightning's American Hockey League (AHL) affiliate, the Syracuse Crunch. He scored his first professional career goal in his debut against the Rochester Americans. During the latter part of the season, Katchouk experienced an 11-game goal-scoring drought which he broke on March 29, 2019, against the Providence Bruins. At the time of the goal, he had recorded 22 points throughout the season including three-multi point games.

On July 31, 2021, Katchouk signed a three-year contract to remain with the Lightning organization. The first year of the contract is a two-way deal, and the second and third years are one way. After attending the Lightning's training camp and participating in pre-season games, Katchouk was named to their opening night roster.

On October 16, 2021, Katchouk made his NHL debut in a 7–6 Lightning overtime victory against the Detroit Red Wings at Little Caesars Arena. On November 13, 2021, Katchouk recorded his first career NHL assist and point against the Florida Panthers. On December 5, 2021, Katchouk recorded his first career NHL goal in a 7-1 Lightning win over the Philadelphia Flyers.

On March 18, 2022, the Lightning, looking to bolster their offense for an upcoming playoff run, traded Katchouk along with teammate Taylor Raddysh and two first-round picks in 2023 and 2024 to the Chicago Blackhawks in exchange for forward Brandon Hagel and two fourth-round draft picks.

Career statistics

Regular season and playoffs

International

Awards and honours

References

External links
 

1998 births
Living people
Canadian ice hockey forwards
Chicago Blackhawks players
Sault Ste. Marie Greyhounds players
Ice hockey people from Vancouver
Syracuse Crunch players
Tampa Bay Lightning draft picks
Tampa Bay Lightning players
Canadian people of Russian descent